Michigan's 10th Senate district is one of 38 districts in the Michigan Senate. It has been represented by Democrat Paul Wojno since 2023, succeeding Republican Michael D. MacDonald.

Geography
District 10 encompasses parts of Macomb and Wayne counties.

2011 Apportionment Plan
District 10, as dictated by the 2011 Apportionment Plan, was based in central Macomb County to the north of Detroit, including Sterling Heights, Macomb Township, and most of Clinton Township.

The district was split between Michigan's 9th and 10th congressional districts, and overlapped with the 24th, 25th, 30th, 31st, and 33rd districts of the Michigan House of Representatives.

Recent election results

2018

2014

Federal and statewide results in District 10

Historical district boundaries

References 

10
Macomb County, Michigan